The Human Betterment Foundation (HBF) was an American eugenics organization established in Pasadena, California in 1928 by E.S. Gosney and Rufus B. von KleinSmid with the aim "to foster and aid constructive and educational forces for the protection and betterment of the human family in body, mind, character, and citizenship". It primarily served to compile and distribute information about compulsory sterilization legislation in the United States, for the purposes of eugenics.

The initial board of trustees were Gosney, Henry Mauris Robinson (a Los Angeles banker), George Dock (a Pasadena physician), David Starr Jordan (chancellor of Stanford University), Charles Goethe (a Sacramento philanthropist), Justin Miller (dean of the college of law at the University of Southern California), Otis Castle (a Los Angeles attorney), Joe G. Crick (a Pasadena horticulturist), and biologist/eugenicist Paul Popenoe. Later members included Lewis Terman (a Stanford psychologist best known for creating the Stanford-Binet test of IQ), Robert Andrews Millikan (Chair of the Executive Council of Caltech), William B. Munro (a Harvard professor of political science), and University of California, Berkeley professors Herbert M. Evans (anatomy) and Samuel J. Holmes (zoology).

After Gosney's death in 1942, Gosney's daughter Lois Castle and the HBF's board liquidated HBF with its funds going to form the Gosney Research Fund at Caltech in 1943. The archives of the Human Betterment Foundation are currently stored at Caltech.

Later public disavowal
On account of Millikan's affiliation with the Human Betterment Foundation, in January 2021, the Caltech Board of Trustees authorized removal of Millikan and Gosney's names (and the names of four other historical figures affiliated with the Foundation), from campus buildings. In June 2020, the University of Southern California removed the name of von KleinSmid from campus buildings on account of his association with eugenics.

See also

American Eugenics Society
British Eugenics Society
Eugenics in the United States
Race Betterment Foundation
Society for Biodemography and Social Biology

References

 "The Human Betterment Foundation," editorial reprinted from Eugenics, Vol. 3, No. 3: 110–113, in Collected papers on eugenic sterilization in California (Pasadena: Human Betterment Foundation, 1930).
 E.S. Gosney and Paul B. Popenoe, Sterilization for Human Betterment: A Summary of Results of 6,000 Operations in California, 1909–1929 (New York: Macmillan, 1929).

External links
 Eugenic Science in California: The Papers of E. S. Gosney and the Human Betterment Foundation

Eugenics in the United States
Organizations based in Pasadena, California
Organizations established in 1928
1943 disestablishments in California
Organizations based in Calgary
Eugenics organizations
1928 establishments in California
History of California